Vellinakshatram is a 2004 Malayalam-language comedy horror film by Vinayan starring Prithviraj Sukumaran and Tharuni Sachdev with Meenakshi, Karthika Mathew, Jayasurya, Jagathy Sreekumar, Jagadeesh, Siddique, Salim Kumar and Thilakan in pivotal roles. It says the story of paranormal events which revolve around Vinod's daughter Ammu, which eventually leads to the revelations of several shocking truths from the past and the inevitable death of the cruel Mahendra Verma.

Plot
Vinod is in love with Aswathy a member of the Lakshmipuram royal family, which has many dark secrets. When Aswathy's mother refuses to allow her to marry Vinod, she elopes and marries him. Just before the birth of their child, Vinod and Aswathy make up with the royal family consisting of two uncles, Pooradam Thirunal Valiya Koyi Thampuran and Pooradam Thirunal cheriya Koyi Thampuran, and their wives. Later a child is born to them, but Aswathy dies mysteriously during the delivery. Her grandmother is bedridden by then. The baby is called Ammu and is looked after by the members of the family, who start thinking that the little girl is possessed by an evil spirit. Vinod hires Indu to babysit  Ammu. Later the family members understand that Indu is also possessed by an evil spirit.

The Pooradam Thirunal uncles meet an exorcist, Valliyankattu Thirumeni, to get a solution for their troubles. The exorcist gives them an enchanted plate to be buried in the original deserted Lakshmipuram palace, the root cause for all the problems. When they try to bury the enchanted plate, they are frightened by the ghosts and become insane. Dr. Sundarasen,a psychiatrist comes to the palace to treat them.

Their brother, Mahendra Verma returns from Kuwait upon hearing his brothers' illness. He falls for the beauty of Indu and try to seduce her only to realise that she is a ghost. He & his brothers, along with the Doctor, goes to Valliyankattu Thirumeni to learn the reason behind these mysterious happenings.

In a flashback, it is revealed that in the days of Sher-e-Mysore (Tipu Sultan), Manavendra Varma, a Keralite king, had joined hands with the British to save his kingdom from falling into the hands of the Sultan. Chandrachoodan was a brave general of the King's army and Indu was his wife, Indumathy Devi, and Ammu, was their daughter. The British general agreed to save the kingdom on the condition that Indumathy submit to him. Manavendra sought his daughter's help to summon Indumathy, as Indumathy was friends with the princess. When Indumathy reaches the palace with her daughter, she was shocked at the betrayal. Out of rage, she tried to kill the British general by pulling the king's sword, but the king managed to snatch the sword and decapitated Indumathy. They decided to bury her body along with her daughter, who was alive, inside the palace itself. The king ordered to kill Chandrachoodan as he returned from his quest, thereby putting everything to an end.

As the child was killed on the day of her birthday, she returned as a vengeful spirit to take revenge on the king. Manavendra Varma, the princess, Chandrachoodan, Indumathy Devi & Ammu reincarnate in the current generation. First, Ashwathy was killed prior to her delivery as she was the princess in her previous birth who betrayed Indumathy Devi. In this birth, Manavendra Verma continuously used to get nightmares and it was prophesied that a child will be born in their family with "Karthika" as its star and that the child will be the cause of his death. And when the child is born, Manavendra Verma will experience a physical disability. As per the prophecy, a girl child was born with the same star to his sister, but he killed the child without the knowledge of the rest of the family members. He lost one side of his vision as a result of the child's birth.

Now Ammu is also born with "Karthika" as a star but by minutes difference, the family mistook a wrong star. Due to the birth of Ammu he lost his hearing ability on one side but did not realize its cause. Mahendra Varma sends his men to kill Ammu and Vinod but they escape.

They arrange for a Pooja to exorcise Indumathy. The exorcist successfully manages to control the spirit of Indumathy, but faints after the pooja. Ammu reaches there & gets angry on seeing Mahendra Verma. In spite of others' efforts from saving him, she manages to kill Mahendra Verma and thus her soul finds peace.

Now a normal Ammu, joins hands of Vinod and Indu and they live happily ever after.

Cast

Soundtrack 
The film's soundtrack contains 8 songs, all composed by M. Jayachandran. Lyrics were by S. Ramesan Nair and Kaithapram.

Box office
The film was a commercial success.

References

External links
 

2004 films
2004 comedy horror films
2000s Malayalam-language films
Indian haunted house films
Indian pregnancy films
Indian comedy horror films
Films shot in Alappuzha
Films shot in Palakkad
Films scored by M. Jayachandran
Films about exorcism